Nava Ashraf is a Canadian economist who is a professor of economics at the London School of Economics as well as research director of the Marshall Institute for Philanthropy and Social Entrepreneurship. Her research interests include development economics, behavioral economics, and family economics.

Biography 
Ashraf earned a B.A. in economics from Stanford University in 1998, and an M.A. and Ph.D. in economics from Harvard University in 2003 and 2005, respectively. After her studies, she began working at Harvard Business School in the Negotiation, Organizations and Markets Unit as assistant professor (2005–10) and later as associate professor (2010–16). Since 2016 Ashraf has been a professor at the London School of Economics. Ashraf maintains affiliations with the CEPR, J-PAL, and BREAD, in particular as research director of the Marshall Institute for Philanthropy and Social Entrepreneurship and co-director of the psychology and economics programme within the Suntory and Toyota International Centres for Economics and Related Disciplines (STICERD). She is also an editor of Economica and a referee for numerous academic journals in economics.
She is a Fellow of the European Economic Association.

Research 
Ashraf's research focuses on development economics, behavioral economics, and family economics. Findings of her research include:
 Commitment savings accounts (i.e. accounts that restrict access to savings for a pre-specified period) may be attractive to women (but not men) displaying hyperbolic discounting and are partly effective in increasing their saving rates (with Dean Karlan and Wesley Yin);
 Spouses' contributions to their household's income depend on which spouse controls the household's saving and spending and on whether information about spouses' incomes is private;
 Most of the (surprisingly small) variance in trust between trust games and dictator games played in Russia, South Africa, and the United States can be explained by reciprocity expectations, with a smaller role for unconditional kindness, while variance in trustworthiness is mainly explained by unconditional kindness (with Iris Bohnet and Nikita Piankov);
 Women (in Zambia) who are given concealable contraceptives in their husbands' presence are 19% less likely to seek family planning services, 25% less likely to use the contraceptives, and 17% more likely to give birth (with Erica Field and Jean Lee);
 Higher prices may stimulate the use of health products, e.g. home water purification solutions, in developing countries due to a screening effect (only households that expect to use the product frequently buy it) but probably not because of psychological sunk cost effects (with James Berry and Jesse M. Shapiro).

Awards 
 Rising Star in Global Health (by Grand Challenges Canada and the Gates Foundation: 2012
 TIAA-CREF Paul. A Samuelson Award Certificate of Excellence (for Tying Odysseus to the Mast: Evidence from a Commitment Savings Product in the Philippines with Dean Karlan and Wesley Yin): 2006
 Queen Elizabeth II Golden Jubilee Medal for Service: 2003
 Order of British Columbia: 1995

References

External links
 Profile of Nava Ashraf on the website of LSE
 Personal page of Nava Ashraf

Harvard Graduate School of Arts and Sciences alumni
Stanford University School of Humanities and Sciences alumni
Behavioral economists
Canadian development economists
Canadian women economists
Living people
Year of birth missing (living people)
Fellows of the European Economic Association